Martina Vondrová (born 3 July 1972) is a Czech cross-country skier. She competed in five events at the 1994 Winter Olympics.

Cross-country skiing results
All results are sourced from the International Ski Federation (FIS).

Olympic Games

World Championships

World Cup

Season standings

References

External links
 

1972 births
Living people
Czech female cross-country skiers
Olympic cross-country skiers of the Czech Republic
Cross-country skiers at the 1994 Winter Olympics
Sportspeople from Jablonec nad Nisou